was a former Japanese international table tennis player.

Table tennis career
Fujii won a gold medal in the doubles with Tadaaki Hayashi at the 1952 World Table Tennis Championships .

He also won a bronze medal in the men's team event at the 1952 World Table Tennis Championships with Daisuke Daimon, Tadaaki Hayashi and Hiroji Satoh.

He later became a coach and earned the nickname 'Cannonball'.

See also
 List of table tennis players
 List of World Table Tennis Championships medalists

References

1925 births
1992 deaths
Japanese male table tennis players
World Table Tennis Championships medalists